Simba is a fictional character and the protagonist of Disney's The Lion King franchise. Introduced in the 1994 film The Lion King, Walt Disney Animation's 32nd animated feature, the character subsequently appears in The Lion King II: Simba's Pride (1998) and The Lion King 1½ (2004) as well as the 2019 remake of the original film. Simba was created by screenwriters Irene Mecchi, Jonathan Roberts and Linda Woolverton. While Mark Henn served as Simba's supervising animator as a cub, Ruben A. Aquino animated the character as he appears as an adult.  

Simba was inspired by the character Bambi from Disney's Bambi (1942), as well as the stories of Moses and Joseph from the Bible. Additionally, several similarities have been drawn between Simba and Prince Hamlet from William Shakespeare's Hamlet. In 1997, The Lion King was adapted into a Broadway musical, with actors Scott Irby-Ranniar and Jason Raize originating the roles of the cub and adult Simba, respectively. JD McCrary and Donald Glover voice the cub and adult Simba respectively in the CGI remake.

Development

Conception

The Lion King was conceived by Disney chairman Jeffrey Katzenberg in 1988. Filmmakers jokingly nicknamed the film "Bambi in Africa" due similarities between the film and Disney's own Bambi (1942), and their respective main characters. Although considered an original coming-of-age story that follows Simba as he grows up and "tak[es] on the responsibility of adulthood," directors Roger Allers and Rob Minkoff drew inspiration from other sources for the character, namely the biblical figures Moses and Joseph. Producer Don Hahn said that, like them, Simba is "born into royalty, is then exiled, and has to return to claim [his] kingdom".

Unlike the studio's three previous films The Little Mermaid (1989), Beauty and the Beast (1991) and Aladdin (1992) which are essentially love stories, The Lion King focuses on Simba's relationship with his father instead, which Allers identified as "The real heart and emotional underpinning of the whole story". In April 1992, the filmmakers hosted a "brainstorming session" in which much of the film's original story was largely re-written, particularly Simba's personality. Originally, Simba was intended to remain with the pride after Mufasa's death until this idea was re-written in order to make the character more "likable and sympathetic."

Several film and entertainment critics have noted similarities and parallels between the stories of The Lion King and William Shakespeare's tragedy Hamlet, and their protagonists. Allers said that these similarities were not initially intentional and came as a surprise to the filmmakers themselves; they noticed the similarities only after the story was established and they eventually decided to pursue it. According to Hahn, "When we first pitched the revised outline of the movie ... someone in the room announced that its themes and relationships were similar to Hamlet. Everyone responded favorably to the idea that we were doing something Shakespearean, so we continued to look for ways to model our film on that all-time classic."

Screenwriter Jonathan Roberts said that, in a musical, songs are used to convey a character's emotions and "I wants." Composer Elton John and lyricist Tim Rice wrote the song "I Just Can't Wait to Be King" in order to give Simba a medium through which he can express his desire to become King of the Pride Lands. Roberts said, "It's a way for storytellers to move the story and deliver the direction of the character."

Voice

Matthew Broderick provided the speaking voice of adult Simba. The first actor to be assigned to The Lion King, Broderick learned of the role while he was on vacation in Ireland, where he received a telephone call from his agent informing him that the directors were interested in casting him as Simba after seeing his film Ferris Bueller's Day Off (1986). The directors decided to cast him as Simba because they felt that he was "perfect" for the role; according to producer Don Hahn, Broderick's voice resembled "the kind of character who could be irresponsible and likeable, but you also felt that he could come back in a very heroic way." Minkoff recalled that the actor "was able to humanize the hero character ... and give Simba a lot of depth", preventing the hero from "becoming 2-dimensional" using "brought a great deal of sensitivity and thoughtfulness to the role along with sincerity and a sense of humor." Jonathan Taylor Thomas, who was starring as Randy Taylor on the television sitcom Home Improvement at the time, was cast as the speaking voice of young Simba. His appearance and personality would later serve as creative inspiration for supervising animator Mark Henn.

Despite often singing in his work, Broderick opted not to perform his own vocals in the film. Toto lead singer Joseph Williams and actor Jason Weaver were hired to dub their respective singing voices.  Williams' voice is heard on the song "Can You Feel the Love Tonight". Impressed by Weaver's performance as a young Michael Jackson in the miniseries The Jacksons: An American Dream, songwriters Elton John and Tim Rice recruited him to record "I Just Can't Wait to Be King" and "Hakuna Matata" while the film was still in its early stages of production. Weaver's vocal tracks were well-liked by Allers and Minkoff that they offered Weaver the speaking role, but later learned Jonathan Taylor Thomas had already accepted the part. As directors, Allers and Minkoff worked closely with the actors in order to ensure credible performances. As frequently done in animated films, the filmmakers videotaped the actors while they recorded their dialogue, allowing the animators to incorporate their specific mannerisms into the designs of their characters.

Personality and design
When The Lion King was green-lit, its concept and story were not well received by studio employees. To guarantee the release of at least one successful film, Katzenberg divided the studio into two separate projects: The Lion King and Pocahontas (1995), the latter of which was expected to be the more successful film. Because of this assumption, the majority of the studio's more seasoned animators gravitated towards Pocahontas, while less experienced animators were assigned to work on The Lion King, which was deemed a "risk". Co-director Rob Minkoff received this positively, saying that this decision "gave a lot of newer animators a chance to step up to leadership roles."

 

The role of animating Simba was divided between Ruben A. Aquino and Mark Henn, the former of whom was the first animator to be assigned to the project. While Henn served as the supervising animator of Simba as a cub, credited as young Simba, Aquino was placed in charge of animating the character as he appears as an adult. The Lion King was Disney's first animated feature film to feature absolutely no humans since Robin Hood (1973). According to Aquino, animating four-legged creatures is difficult because the artists are faced with the task of drawing "twice as many legs ... as you do with human characters" and must also attribute to them both human and animal-like qualities. For assistance, Aquino drew influence from previous animated films that feature four-legged creatures as their main characters, citing Bambi, Lady and the Tramp (1955) and The Jungle Book (1967) as his main sources of inspiration.

Before The Lion King, Henn's experience as a supervising animator was limited to predominantly female characters; he had just recently completed work on Ariel from The Little Mermaid (1989), Belle from Beauty and the Beast (1991) and Jasmine from Aladdin (1992). When he became involved with The Lion King, Henn initially expressed interest in animating the film's villain, Scar, because he wanted to do "something different." However, producer Don Hahn felt that he was better suited for animating Simba. Henn approaches animating new characters by "put[ting himself] into the character's situation." Simba proved to be a challenge because Henn was faced with the task of creating an animated character who would both appear and behave like a real lion cub. To achieve this, Henn visited zoos, sketched and studied live lion cubs that were brought into the studio for research, and frequently consulted with wildlife experts. Simba's short hair follows from the extreme heat of the lion's native climate, as does the thickness of the skin depicted on each paw, allowing him to swiftly navigate the grasslands. 

When it came time to animate Simba during the "I Just Can't Wait to Be King" musical sequence, Henn felt it essential that the character remain on all fours at all times, despite the fact that he is meant to be dancing. In terms of personality, Henn aimed to depict Simba as a "cocky, confident character" at the beginning of the film, who must eventually mature and learn to take responsibility. The animators would often observe and document the voice actors while they recorded their dialogue, using their movements and mannerisms as a visual aid. Actor Jonathan Taylor Thomas, who provided the voice of young Simba, served as inspiration for the design and personality of Simba. Henn said, "I loved watching Jonathan Taylor Thomas when he was a boy on Home Improvement, and getting to meet him and observe him." Although Aquino was responsible for animating the majority of Simba's adult sequences, Henn animated the character's first appearance as an adult that occurs near the end of the "Hakuna Matata" musical number.

Appearances

The Lion King

Released in theaters in 1994, The Lion King marks Simba's first appearance. All the animals in the Pride Lands gather at the foot of Pride Rock to commemorate the birth of Simba, who will eventually succeed to the throne and take his father Mufasa's place as king. Furious by the fact that he is no longer next in line, Simba's jealous paternal uncle Scar refuses to attend the ceremony. While Simba grows into a rambunctious lion cub who frequently boasts about the fact that he will someday rule over the Pride Lands, Scar secretly plots against him.

Scar plots regicide and familicide against Simba and Mufasa by luring Simba into a vast gorge, where he triggers a wildebeest stampede. Notified by Scar that Simba is in danger, Mufasa rushes to his aid and manages to place him safely on a ledge. Weakened and unable to pull himself up the steep slope to safety, Mufasa asks his younger brother for assistance. However, Scar's true nature is revealed and he betrays Mufasa, throwing him into the gorge where he is killed by the fall.

Tricked by Scar into thinking that he was the cause of Mufasa's demise, Simba runs away to a distant jungle where he is befriended by Timon and Pumbaa, a meerkat and a warthog who both help him put his past behind him whilst living a carefree life under "hakuna matata" ("no worries" in Swahili). There, he grows into a young adult lion who vaguely resembles his late father, while Scar wreaks havoc on the Pride Lands. When Simba is discovered by his childhood friend; a lioness named Nala, she confronts him, warning him of Scar's tyranny and begging him to return home. However, Simba refuses out of guilt of his father's death until a wise mandrill named Rafiki leads him to Mufasa's ghost, who convinces him to return home and take his rightful place as king.

Realizing that he can no longer run from his past, Simba returns to the Pride Lands with Nala, Timon and Pumbaa and finds them barren because their natural resources have been squandered and abused by Scar. After witnessing Scar strike his mother Sarabi, Simba orders Scar to abdicate. At first thrown by the fact that he is alive, Scar soon regains composure and forces Simba to reveal that he is responsible for Mufasa's death, while cornering him at the edge of Pride Rock, hoping to subject him to a similar fate as his father. Having grown overconfident, Scar finally reveals that he killed Mufasa to Simba, who furiously tackles his uncle and forces him into announcing this to the pride, initiating a battle between them and Scar's hyena army. Simba eventually defeats Scar and throws him into a pit, where he is cornered and killed by the hyenas, who overheard Scar blaming them for what he'd done. With Simba king and the Pride Lands returned to its former glory, the inhabitants welcome the birth of his and Nala's firstborn.

The Lion King II: Simba's Pride

A direct-to-video sequel released in 1998, Simba's Pride picks up immediately where the first film left off, depicting Simba and Nala as king and queen of the Pride Lands. In a ceremony at Pride Rock, the Pride Lands commemorate the birth of Simba and Nala's daughter Kiara, whom Simba is overprotective of. One day when Kiara is a young cub, Simba discovers that she has disobeyed him by visiting the forbidden Outlands, home to an enemy pride of Scar's followers known as the Outsiders, and befriending a young member of the pride named Kovu. After a close confrontation with Kovu's mother Zira, the leader of the Outsiders and Scar's most loyal follower, Simba separates the two and reminds Kiara of her responsibilities as the future queen. Meanwhile, Zira plots to manipulate Kovu to exact revenge on Simba for Scar's death.

Several years later, Simba grants an adolescent Kiara's request to embark on her first hunt, but has Timon and Pumbaa follow her in secret. Realizing this, Kiara rebels and pursue her hunt outside of the Pride Lands, where she nearly falls victim to a wildfire. Kiara is rescued by Kovu, who returns her to the Pride Lands, which is actually part of Zira's plan to overthrow Simba. Saying that he has left the Outsiders, Kovu asks Simba to let him join his pride. Simba reluctantly accepts, but distrusts Kovu because of his similarities to Scar, and continues to treat him ruthlessly. That night, Simba has a nightmare about attempting to save his father Mufasa from falling into the stampede but is stopped by Scar who turns into Kovu and throws Simba off the cliff into the stampede.

While Kiara and Kovu's friendship continues to grow, Simba, encouraged by Nala, attempts to show Kovu kindness by spending a day with him. Realizing that Kovu is beginning to side with Simba because of his love for Kiara, Zira ambushes and attacks Simba. Convinced by Zira that Kovu is responsible for the ambush, Simba exiles him and forbids Kiara to see him, but she makes her father realize that he is acting irrationally and trying too hard to be Mufasa, before leaving to find Kovu. When a battle ensues between the Pride Landers and the Outsiders, Kiara and Kovu arrive and stop them, with Kiara telling them that they are one, helping Simba to realize that despite their hatred for one another they are the same. This convinced Simba to accept the Outsiders back to his pride. When a furious Zira attacks Simba, she is intercepted by Kiara, causing the two to fall over the edge of a cliff. Having landed safely on a ledge, Kiara offers to help Zira, who is struggling to hang on. However, Zira, consumed by her resentment towards Simba, falls to her death. Simba finally approves of Kiara's love for Kovu and reconciles with his daughter, and accepts the two lions as the future queen regnant and king consort of the Pride Lands.

The Lion King 1½

In The Lion King 1½, a direct-to-video followup released in 2004, Simba appears as a less prominent character because the film's primary focus is on Timon and Pumbaa's behind-the-scenes role and involvement in The Lion King, in which they appear as supporting characters. Although the two films technically share the same story and timeline, the plot of The Lion King 1 1/2 focuses more on Timon and Pumbaa. The meerkat and warthog unknowingly coexist alongside Simba, and the story fills in the two characters' backstories and events that led up to their long-lasting friendship, coinciding with and often initiating the events that affect Simba's life during the first film. These events include the commemorative bow that occurs during the opening "Circle of Life" musical number and the collapsing of the animal tower that takes place during "I Just Can't Wait to Be King." The film also explores, in further detail, the relationship among the three characters as Timon and Pumbaa struggle to raise Simba as adoptive "parents" and disapprove of his relationship with Nala, portraying Simba as he grows from an energetic young lion cub, into an incorrigible teenager and, finally, an independent young lion.

The Lion King (2019)

On July 19, 2019, Walt Disney Pictures released a CGI remake of The Lion King. The film was directed and produced by Jon Favreau and written by Jeff Nathanson. In this version, Donald Glover was cast for the role of adult Simba.

Glover said that "[The Lion King is] a timeless story, but [he thinks] the way Favreau has constructed it, it's a very timely story as well" and said that "[he] just wanted to be a part of a global good". The actor had previously worked with Favreau on the Marvel Cinematic Universe film Spider-Man: Homecoming (2017). Glover said that the film will focus more on Simba's time growing up than the original film did, stating that "[Jon] was very keen in making sure we saw [Simba's] transition from boy to man and how hard that can be when there's been a deep trauma". On November 1, 2017, JD McCrary was cast as young Simba. McCrary said that "Donald Glover is so talented that [he] actually did have to take it into consideration, because if Simba is going to grow up to be some sort of figure and you know of it, you have to keep that motive".

Timon and Pumbaa and television

The success of The Lion King and popularity of its characters led to the production of Timon & Pumbaa, an animated television series starring Timon and Pumbaa. Simba makes several appearances, including one episode in which Timon drags him out to try to revive Pumbaa's lost memory.

In the episode "Congo On Like This," Timon and Pumbaa (especially Timon) suspect that Simba has reverted to his carnivorous nature. The episode "Shake Your Djibouti" again features Simba, when Timon and Pumbaa are forced to train him to protect them from a laboratory monster. Another episode, entitled "Rome Alone," shows Simba being captured by Romans and forced into gladiatorial battle with another lion named Claudius. Simba makes brief appearances in "Once Upon a Timon", "Zazu's Off-By-One Day", and "Beethoven's Whiff". He also appears in a music video of "The Lion Sleeps Tonight".

Simba was featured as a guest in the animated series House of Mouse, in which he alternates between being a cub and an adult.

The Lion Guard

In January 2016, a new series called The Lion Guard premiered, following a television pilot film The Lion Guard: Return of the Roar in November 2015. Set within the time gap in The Lion King II: Simba's Pride (except the final episode titled "Return to The Pride Lands, which takes place after the film), it features Kion who is the son and youngest child of Simba and Nala, who as the second-born cub, is tasked with assembling a team to protect the Pride Lands.

Broadway musical

The success of The Lion King led to the production of a Broadway musical based on the film. Directed by Julie Taymor, with a book by Irene Mecchi and Roger Allers, The Lion King premiered at the New Amsterdam Theatre on November 13, 1997, where it ran for nine years until being moved to the Minskoff Theatre on June 13, 2006. The role of Simba was originated by Scott Irby-Ranniar and Jason Raize, with Irby-Ranniar portraying young Simba and Raize portraying adult Simba.

Raize auditioned for the role of adult Simba after hearing that Taymor was looking to cast an actor who was of "unidentifiable ethnicity." Raize revealed in an interview that there was a lot of competition for the role because the musical required "triple-threat work – singing, dancing and acting – that you don't get to such an extent in other shows. It was more the sense of who can take the challenge and not be daunted by the task." Raize, who instantly felt that he "had a connection with Simba," eventually won the role with the approval of Taymor and choreographer Garth Fagan, with Fagan admiring the fact that Raize was "willing to try, to fail, and then to try again." Once cast, Raize found it difficult to maintain Taymor's "sense of duality" because Simba is "both man and beast." He said, "The tendency is to sacrifice one for the other, but you can't." Although hundreds of children auditioned for the role of young Simba, the casting process was far less grueling for Irby-Ranniar who, according to Taymor, simply "walked in and he had the part."

Miscellaneous

Books
In 1994, a six-volume book set titled The Lion King: Six New Adventures were released. Set after the events of the first film, they featured a cub named Kopa, who was the son of Simba and Nala.

Merchandising and video games
As part of the franchise's merchandising, Simba has appeared in various The Lion King-related products. The character's likeness has been used in and adapted into a variety of items, including plush toys and figurines, clothing, bedding, household decor and appliances. The success of the Broadway musical has also led to its own line of merchandising, including the Simba beanbag doll, based on the character's appearance and costume in the Broadway show.

Since the film's 1994 debut, Simba has appeared as a playable character in a variety of video game releases, both directly and indirectly associated with the franchise. The character's first appearance as a video game character was in The Lion King, which was released by Virgin Interactive on November 1, 1994, for the video game platforms Super Nintendo Entertainment System, Sega Game Gear, Nintendo Entertainment System, and PC. The game follows the plot of the original film and features Simba as both a cub and an adult.

On December 28, 2000, Activision released The Lion King: Simba's Mighty Adventure for Game Boy Color and PlayStation. The game encompasses 10 levels and incorporates the plot of both The Lion King and The Lion King II: Simba's Pride as "Simba ... matures from a precocious cub to an adult lion."

Simba appears in the Square Enix Kingdom Hearts video game franchise as a friend and ally of the series' main character, Sora, appearing as a character to summon in Kingdom Hearts, Kingdom Hearts: Chain of Memories and Kingdom Hearts III, and a companion in battle in Kingdom Hearts II.

Simba also appears as a playable character in Disney Interactive Studios' Disney's Extreme Skate Adventure, released on September 3, 2003, for Game Boy Advance, PlayStation 2, GameCube and Xbox,

Simba is one of the central characters in Disney Friends, released for Nintendo DS on February 26, 2008, where the player can interact with him.

Simba is a playable character to unlock for a limited time in Disney Magic Kingdoms.

Walt Disney Parks and Resorts
Live versions of Simba appear in the Lion King musical and in the parades and shows at the Walt Disney Parks and Resorts.

Simba was also the main character in "Legend of the Lion King," a former Fantasyland attraction in Walt Disney World's Magic Kingdom, which retold the story of the film using fully articulated puppets. Other Disney attractions that have featured Simba include the Mickey's PhilharMagic 3D show and the Hong Kong Disneyland version of It's a Small World.

He appeared as one of the main characters at Epcot's Land Pavilion 12-minute edutainment film Circle of Life: An Environmental Fable, until its closure in 2018. He currently appears in animatronic form in Festival of the Lion King at Disney's Animal Kingdom.

Reception and legacy

Critical response
Reception towards Simba has been generally mixed. The Christian Science Monitors David Sterritt hailed Simba as "a superbly realized character," specifically praising the scene in which the character "faces discipline by his dad after his adventure with the hyenas." Owen Gleiberman of Entertainment Weekly wrote that Simba "has been given a marvelously expressive face" to the point of which "He seems more human than the Ken and Barbie types featured in Aladdin and The Little Mermaid." Peter Travers of Rolling Stone described "the father-son relationship" shared by Simba and Mufasa as "movingly rendered," while About.com's David Nusair wrote, "it's the touching father/son stuff that lies at the heart of the movie that cements The Lion Kings place as an utterly timeless piece of work." James Berardinelli of ReelViews enjoyed the fact that the film focuses more on the story of Simba himself as opposed to the romantic relationship developing between the character and Nala. However, Berardinelli criticized Matthew Broderick's vocal performance, describing it as "nondescript." Rob Humanick of Slant Magazine hailed the fact that "it's never laid on [Simba] that his time as king will directly correspond with the eventual passing of his father" as one of the film's "most important facets." However, he criticized The Lion Kings characters, describing them as well-designed but "lazy and troublesome." The Austin Chronicles Robert Faires felt that Simba and the other Lion King characters, though "true", were simply unoriginal retreads of preceding animated characters who were "swiped from other Disney cartoons."

Hal Hinson of The Washington Post gave the character a negative review. Labeling Timon and Pumbaa the only interesting characters in The Lion King, Hinson questioned Simba's role as the film's hero. Kenneth Turan of the Los Angeles Times agreed, "A movie's heroes may have their names above the title, but often as not it's the sidekicks who get the real work done." Turan went on to pan Simba, describing him as "irritatingly callow." Chris Hick of the Deseret News complained about the fact that Simba and the other "characters in The Lion King are not as warm and fuzzy as other Disney animated features," crediting this with making "the film a bit tougher to warm [up] to." ComingSoon.net strongly panned Simba as a lead character, writing, "typically for Disney animated fare, it's the hero who is the weak link being both blandly designed and blandly performed." Acknowledging the character's Shakespearean origins, The Baltimore Suns Stephen Hunter gave Simba a negative review, writing, "Alas ...Simba stands in for Hamlet, but he's a lot less complicated; in fact, he's less complicated than Morris the Cat or Sylvester." Hunter continued, "Simba the Exile is even less interesting than Simba the Prince." Christopher Null of Contactmusic.com was critical of Weaver's performance as the singing voice of Young Simba, writing, "If there's anything annoying about the film, it's the singing. Young Simba sounds like a young Michael Jackson ... You almost don't want him to succeed." However, Null reacted more positively towards Broderick's performance.

Despite the character's mixed reception, several critics have awarded specific praise to Broderick for his portrayal of Simba, including the San Francisco Chronicles Peter Stack and The Washington Posts Desson Howe. Annette Basile of FilmInk described Broderick's performance as "excellent," while Peter Bradshaw of The Guardian called it "sumptuous." Digital Spy's Mayer Nissim described Broderick's portrayal of Simba as "wonderful."

A number of critics and animators have claimed striking similarities between Simba and Kimba, the protagonist of Osamu Tezuka's 1960s Japanese anime series Kimba the White Lion, and they believe Simba may have been inspired by Kimba.

Impact and popularity
During the film's opening number, "Circle of Life", Rafiki introduces a newborn Simba to the crowd of animals gathered at the foot of Pride Rock by holding him high above their heads while parents Mufasa and Sarabi look on. Since the film's 1994 release, this scene has grown to iconic status. In November 2002, singer Michael Jackson sparked controversy by holding his son, Blanket, over the protective railing of a hotel balcony in Berlin. The event was witnessed by a large crowd of spectators who were watching from below. Some sources have claimed that Jackson was harmlessly attempting to emulate the scene from The Lion King.

When Kate Middleton, Duchess of Cambridge went into labor with hers and Prince William's baby in July 2013, the idea that the couple should reenact the famous scene from The Lion King became quite popular among Twitter users. Radio journalist Darren Simpson reportedly tweeted, "when your baby arrives please re-enact the scene from the Lion King". Shortly after Middleton gave birth to a boy, England native Tommy Peto initiated a petition asking the couple to welcome their baby by having the Archbishop of Canterbury emulate the scene by holding him over the balcony of Buckingham Palace. Ultimately, the idea was deemed "outside the responsibility of the government" and was declined.

The scene has found itself the subject of both reference and parody in various forms of media, such as in the film George of the Jungle (1997). In what is almost an exact replica of the scene, George, portrayed by actor Brendan Fraser, takes the place of both Rafiki and Mufasa by standing at the tip of Pride Rock and presenting his young son to a crowd of onlooking animals, accompanied by wife Ursula, portrayed by Leslie Mann.

During the third season finale of Once Upon a Time, the main character Emma Swan asked her parents Snow White and David Nolan if they were going to hold up her yet unnamed baby brother like in The Lion King. 
Since the release of The Lion King in 1994, the name "Simba" has increased in use and popularity among dog and cat owners. According to Comcast in 2010, the use of Simba as a dog name reemerged in popularity in 2009 after experiencing a noticeable decline in 2001, ranking the name ninth out of 10 on its list of "Top 10 Trendiest Dog Names of the Year." In May 2013, Yahoo! Lifestyle included the name on its list of "Trendiest Dog Names." According to YouPet, Simba is the 17th most popular cat name out of 100 candidates. Care2 included Simba in its article "All-around Cool Cat Names," while DutchNews.nl reported that Simba ranks among the country's most popular cat names as of July 2013. In its list of "Top Popular Pet Names," BabyNames.com placed Simba at number 64 on its list of most popular dog names out of the 100 that were considered.

References

The Lion King (franchise) characters
Fictional exiles
Fictional lions
Fictional princes
Fictional kings
Fictional tribal chiefs
Fictional outlaws
Male characters in animated films
Film characters introduced in 1994
Animated characters introduced in 1994
Child characters in animated films
Fictional characters with post-traumatic stress disorder